The Former Tainan Weather Observatory is a former weather station in West Central District, Tainan, Taiwan.

History
The weather station was built in 1897 during the Japanese rule of Taiwan. For a very long time, the building had been remained unused. The Tainan City Government designated it a municipal historic site in 1998, and it became a national historic site in 2003. It later opened as a museum, and was closed for six months to repair damage from the 2016 southern Taiwan earthquake. On 31 March 2019, it was reopened to the public.

Architecture
The building has a round structure following three concentric circles with offices on the outside, tower access on the inside and a circular hallway running between them. The top of the tower contains the exterior instruments.

Transportation
The building is accessible within walking distance south west of Tainan Station of Taiwan Railways.

See also
 List of tourist attractions in Taiwan

References

1897 establishments in Taiwan
Buildings and structures in Tainan
Tainan Weather Observatory
Tourist attractions in Tainan
National monuments of Taiwan